Evgeniya Andreyevna Shelgunova  (born 3 August 1997) is a Russian artistic gymnast, Master of Sports of Russia.

Career 
She has been a member of the main Russian artistic gymnastics team since towards the end of 2012. Earlier, in 2011 Shelgunova won five gold and one silver medals at the 5th Summer Russian Student Games and in May 2012 at the European Junior Championships in Brussels took the gold in the team competition, the silver in the individual all-around, and the bronze on uneven bars. At the 2013 Russian Championships she won the bronze medal in the team event, the bronze medal in the individual all-around, and the gold medal on beam.

Competitive history

References

External links 
 Evgeniya Shelgunova's profile on the official website of the Artistic Gymnastics Federation of Russia
 EC Brussels 2012 (Juniors), Evgeniya SHELGUNOVA (RUS) — video on the official channel of the UEG on YouTube

1997 births
Living people
People from Alatyr, Chuvash Republic
Russian female artistic gymnasts
Universiade medalists in gymnastics
Universiade gold medalists for Russia
Medalists at the 2017 Summer Universiade
Sportspeople from Chuvashia